Operation World is a reference book and prayer guide, begun by Patrick Johnstone and continued by Jason Mandryk, both from WEC International, a Christian mission agency.  The first edition was published by Dorothea Mission, later editions by Send the Light, publishing branch of Operation Mobilisation (OM). The latest edition of Operation World was published by Biblica, but is now distributed by InterVarsity Press (IVP) after IVP acquired the publishing arm of Biblica in late 2011. Operation World content has been made available online. It is aimed at informing Christians about every country in the world in order to encourage the church to pray for the world and to engage the world in Christian mission. This resource refers to itself as being written from a broadly evangelical Christian perspective.

History and description 
Operation World was on the list of the 50 most influential evangelical books in Christianity Today magazine. It is intended to mobilize the church to effective intercession and world mission and ultimately, to help the global Church fulfil the Great Commission.

Operation World has been published in seven editions. The most recent is the 2010 edition, released in October 2010, the first major update since the 2001 edition. The original edition was produced in 1974 by Patrick Johnstone, a missionary in South Africa, as a 32-page booklet of basic information about 30 countries. Operation World has been translated into several other languages: Spanish, French, Dutch, German, Portuguese, Russian, Korean, Indonesian, and simplified Chinese. Parts of Operation World have been translated into Arabic, Urdu, and Czech. The cumulative number of copies printed in all languages exceeds 2.5 million. In the missionary tradition of the Dorothea Mission and WEC International, the team behind the production of Operation World consists only of volunteers (i.e., no salaried staff). 

The 1,000-plus page prayer resource is also organized as a calendar-year daily prayer guide. Each country's section begins with basic information on geography, demographics, population, literacy, economy, etc. Operation World then gives a breakdown of percentage of religions, Christian denominations, and missions groups, followed by points for prayer. These prayer points are directed toward the social, political, economic, cultural, and religious life of each nation, as well as life and activity of the existing Church in each country.

Thematically, Operation World begins with global issues and world missions, then narrows to cover the six continents before it settles into a country-by-country format, covering every nation and autonomous territory.

Data is gathered from sources including primary input from national Christian church leaders, missionaries, and researchers. A consultative process is used, eliciting input and response from nearly 2,000 such contacts in every part of the world. Information is also gathered from more than 300 periodicals and journals, articles from news agencies, datasets from international organizations and non-government organizations, websites of churches and ministries around the world, and more encyclopedic resources such as the World Christian Encyclopedia, the Ethnologue, and the Joshua Project. The Operation World database includes information on approximately 33,000 Christian denominations, 16 major religions, 1,200 missions agencies, and 16,000 fields of ministry.

Additional Operation World resources include the book in paperback, CD, DVD or ebook formats, individual country profiles, and prayer maps and are all available from InterVarsity Press.

Work has begun on an eighth edition to be published in both hard copy and digital format, along with auxiliary resources.

Other resources produced by the Operation World team include:

Pray for the World, an abridged and simplified English version of Operation World, and was published in 2015 by IVP. Pray for the World was published for the purpose of greater engagement with those who may not be inclined to use a 1000+ page reference volume. It is easier to read for non-native English speakers, more affordable due to smaller size, and a more feasible project for translation. Thus far, it has been translated into Chinese, Korean, Indonesian, Spanish, Portuguese, Urdu, Hindi, Russian, Arabic, and Amharic. 

Window on the World, the children's version of Operation World. Window on the World began life as You Can Change the World, written by Patrick Johnstone's late first wife, Jill and published in 1992. A followup volume, You Too Can Change the World, was completed by Daphne Spraggett, using Jill's unfinished work. These two volumes became a compendium in 2001, with the new name Window on the World. The 2nd edition, released in October 2018 was edited by Molly Wall and Jason Mandryk and published by IVP in the USA and by Lion Hudson in the UK. It was subsequently published in German by Christliche Bücherstuben GmbH.

The free Operation World mobile app in English and German. The mobile app is updated at least annually, taking advantage of the digital environment to allow for more frequent corrections and changes to the content - a challenge that paper publications face when they are produced infrequently. The most recent app update was in January 2022.

OW has also published a free weekly church bulletin entitled "Praying for the World" resource in a collaborative partnership with the Lausanne Movement. This resource is published in English, Greek, and Hungarian, with other translations in production.

References

External links
 Operation World online
 WEC International

Christian missions